Copocrossa is a genus of jumping spiders that was first described by Eugène Louis Simon in 1901.

Species
 it contains four species, found in Indonesia, Kenya, Malaysia, and Queensland:
Copocrossa albozonata Caporiacco, 1949 – Kenya
Copocrossa harpina Simon, 1903 – Indonesia (Sumatra)
Copocrossa politiventris Simon, 1901 – Malaysia
Copocrossa tenuilineata (Simon, 1900) (type) – Australia (Queensland)

References

Salticidae  genera
Fauna of Sumatra
Salticidae
Spiders of Africa
Spiders of Oceania